Oni Press is an American comic book company. They are known as a publisher of graphic novels, as well as for series like Queen & Country.

Titles

A
 The Adventures of Barry Ween, Boy Genius by Judd Winick
 Alison Dare by J. Torres and J. Bone
 Aggretsuko by Daniel Barnes and D.J. Kirkland
 The Apocalipstix by Ray Fawkes and Cameron Stewart
 Atomic City by Jay Stephens
 The Awakening by Neal Shaffer and Luca Genovese

B
 Bad Boy by Frank Miller and Simon Bisley
 Bad Ideas by Jim Mahfood, Wayne Chinsang and Dave Crosland
 Bad Medicine by Christina Weir, Nunzio DeFilippis, and Christopher Mitten
 Black Metal by Rick Spear and Chuck BB
 Blair Witch Chronicles by Jen Van Meter and Guy Davis
 Blue Monday by Chynna Clugston
 Borrowed Time by Neal Shaffer and Joe Infurnari
 Breakfast After Noon by Andi Watson
 The Bunker by Josh Fialkov and Joe Infurnari

C
 Capote in Kansas by Ande Parks and Chris Samnee
 Cheat by Christine Norrie
 Cheater Code by Alex Forte and Daryl Toh
 Ciudad by Ande Parks and Joe & Anthony Russo 
 Clerks. by Kevin Smith
 Closer by Antony Johnston and Mike Norton
 The Coffin by Phil Hester and Mike Huddleston
 The Coldest City by Antony Johnston
 The Coldest Winter by Antony Johnston
 Courtney Crumrin by Ted Naifeh
 Crogan's Vengeance by Chris Schweizer
 Crogan's March by Chris Schweizer
 Crogan's Loyalty by Chris Schweizer
 Cut my Hair by Jamie S Rich

D
 The Damned by Cullen Bunn and Brian Hurtt
 Days Like This by J. Torres and Scott Chantler
 Dead Goombas by J. Torres and Andy B.
 Deep Sleeper by Phil Hester and Mike Huddleston
 Dumped by Andi Watson

F
 F-Stop by Antony Johnston and Matthew Loux
 Fortune and Glory by Brian Michael Bendis
 Frenemy of the State by Rashida Jones, Nunzio DeFilippis and Christina Weir
 Frumpy the Clown by Judd Winick

G
 Geisha by Andi Watson
 Grrl Scouts by Jim Mahfood
 Guerillas by Brahm Revel

H
 Hopeless Savages by Jen Van Meter
 Hysteria by Mike Hawthorne

I
 Invader Zim by Jhonen Vasquez
 It Took Luke: Overworked and Underpaid by Mark Bouchard and Bayleigh Underwood

J
 Jason and the Argobots by J Torres and Mike Norton
 Jay and Silent Bob by Kevin Smith and Duncan Fegredo
 Jingle Belle by Paul Dini
 Julius by Antony Johnston and Brett Weldele

K
 Kaijumax  by Zander Cannon
 Killer Princesses by Gail Simone and Lea Hernandez
 Kim Reaper by Sarah Graley
 Kissing Chaos by Arthur Dela Cruz

L
 Last Exit Before Toll by Neal Shaffer and Chris Mitten
 The Leading Man by B. Clay Moore and Jeremy Haun
 Letter 44 by Charles Soule and Alberto Jimenez Alburquerque
 Local by Brian Wood and Ryan Kelly
 The Long Haul by Antony Johnston and Eduardo Barreto
 Lost at Sea by Bryan Lee O'Malley
 Love As A Foreign Language by J. Torres and Eric Kim
 Love Fights by Andi Watson

M
 Madman by Mike Allred
 Maintenance by Jim Massey and Robbi Rodriguez
 Maria's Wedding by Nunzio DeFilippis, Christina Weir and Jose Garibaldi
 Marquis by Guy Davis
 Midnight Mover by Gary Phillips, Jeremy Love and Jeff Wasson
 Mutant, Texas: Tales of Sheriff Ida Red by Paul Dini and J Bone
 My Inner Bimbo by Sam Kieth

N
 Nocturnals by Dan Brereton
 No Dead Time by Brian McLachlan and Tom Williams
 Northwest Passage by Scott Chantler
 North World by Lars Brown

O
 Oddville! by Jay Stephens
 Off Road by Sean Murphy
 Ojo by Sam Kieth
 Once in a Blue Moon by Nunzio DeFilippis and Christina Weir
 One Bad Day by Steve Rolston
 One Plus One by Neal Shaffer and Daniel Krall
 Oni Double Feature

P
 PENG by Corey Lewis
 Petrograd by Philip Gelatt and Tyler Crook
 Play Ball by Christina Weir and Nunzio DeFilippis
 Polly and the Pirates by Ted Naifeh
 Pounded by Brian Wood and Steve Rolston
 Princess Ugg by Ted Naifeh
 Puffed by John Layman and Dave Crosland

Q
 Queen & Country by Greg Rucka and various
A Quick & Easy Guide to Sex & Disability by A. Andrews

R
 Resurrection by Marc Guggenheim and David Dumeer
 Rick and Morty by Justin Roiland and Dan Harmon

S
 Scandalous by J Torres and Scott Chantler
 Scooter Girl by Chynna Clugston
 Scott Pilgrim by Bryan Lee O'Malley
 The Secret History of D.B. Cooper by Brian Churilla
 Sharknife by Corey Lewis
 Shenanigans by Ian Shaughnessy and Mike Holmes
 Shot Callerz by Gary Phillips and Brett Weldele
 Sidekicks by J. Torres and Takeshi Miyazawa
 SideScrollers by Matthew Loux
 The Sixth Gun by Cullen Bunn and Brian Hurtt
 Skinwalker by Nunzio DeFilippis, Christina Weir and Brian Hurtt
 Soulwind by Scott Morse
 Space Battle Lunchtime by Natalie Riess
 Space Trash by Jenn Woodall
 Spaghetti Western by Scott Morse
 Spell Checkers by Joëlle Jones, Jamie S. Rich & Nico Hitori de 
 Spooked by Antony Johnston and Sophie Campbell
 Stumptown by Greg Rucka and Matthew Southworth
 Strangetown by Chynna Clugston and Ian Shaughnessy
 Super Pro K.O.! by Jarrett Williams

T
 Tales of Ordinary Madness by Malcolm Bourne and Mike Allred
 Tek Jansen (Stephen Colbert's Tek Jansen Adventures) by John Layman, Tom Peyer and Jim Massey
 Three Days in Europe by Antony Johnston and Mike Hawthorne
 Three Strikes by Nunzio DeFilippis, Christina Weir and Brian Hurtt
 The Tomb by Nunzio DeFilippis, Christina Weir and Chris Mitten

U
 Union Station by Ande Parks and Eduardo Barreto

V
 Visitations by Scott Morse
 Volcanic Revolver by Scott Morse

W
 Wasteland by Antony Johnston and Christopher Mitten
 Wet Moon by Sophie Campbell
 Whiteout by Greg Rucka and Steve Lieber
 Whiteout: Melt by Greg Rucka and Steve Lieber

Notes

References

External links
Oni Press book list

Oni Press at the Big Comic Book DataBase

Oni Press